Daniel Woodrell (born March 4, 1953) is an American novelist and short story writer, who has written nine novels, most of them set in the Missouri Ozarks, and one collection of short stories. Woodrell coined the phrase "country noir" to describe his 1996 novel Give Us a Kiss. Reviewers have frequently since used the term to categorize his writing.

Early life and education
Woodrell was born in Springfield, Missouri, in the southwestern corner of the state.  He grew up in Missouri and dropped out of high school to join the Marines. Later he earned a BA from the University of Kansas and an MFA from the Iowa Writers' Workshop.
The University of Missouri Kansas City  awarded an honorary doctorate to Daniel Woodrell on December 17, 2016.

Marriage and family
He lives in West Plains, Missouri, in the Ozarks and is married to the novelist Katie Estill.

Career
Woodrell has set most of his eight novels in the Missouri Ozarks, a landscape which he knew from childhood.  He has created novels based on crime, a style he termed "country noir", a phrase which has been adopted by commentators on his work. However, William Boyle, an avowed fan and fellow author of literary crime fiction, put Woodrell's work in broader context: "this Woodrell guy’s got double of everything. Language, plot, dialogue, sense of place, energy, tension...He’s interested in the whole of humanity through the lens of his place."

In addition to finding readers for his fiction, Woodrell has had three novels adapted for films. 
Woodrell's second novel, Woe to Live On (1987), was adapted for the 1999 film Ride with the Devil, directed by Ang Lee.

Winter's Bone (2006) was adapted by writer and director Debra Granik for a film of the same title, released commercially in June 2010 after winning two awards at the Sundance Film Festival, including the Grand Jury Prize for a dramatic film. Several critics called it one of the best films of the year and an American classic, and it received four Academy Award nominations, including Best Picture.

Tomato Red (1998) was adapted for a 2017 feature film by Irish writer and director Juanita Wilson. This was released in Ireland in March 2017 and went on to be nominated for four awards at that year's Irish Film & Television Awards, including Best Film. Its US debut took place on April 23, 2017 at the Newport Beach International Film Festival.

While filming a segment for Anthony Bourdain: No Reservations, Woodrell was filmed breaking his shoulder in a boat fishing accident.

Honors
 1999 PEN USA award for Fiction for his novel Tomato Red (1998).
 2000 He was longlisted for the International Dublin Literary Award for Tomato Red.
 2008 - His short story "Uncle", originally published in A Hell of a Woman: An Anthology of Female Noir (2007), was nominated for a 2008 Edgar Award.
 2010 Sundance Film Festival award for top dramatic film for adaptation of his novel Winter's Bone (published in 2006)

Bibliography
 Under the Bright Lights (Henry Holt, 1986)
 Woe to Live On (Henry Holt, 1987)
 Muscle for the Wing (Henry Holt, 1988)
 The Ones You Do (Henry Holt, 1992)
 Give Us a Kiss: A Country Noir (Henry Holt, 1996)
 Tomato Red (Henry Holt, 1998)
 The Death of Sweet Mister (Putnam, 2001)
 Winter's Bone (Little, Brown, 2006)
 The Bayou Trilogy (Mulholland Books, 2011) (an omnibus volume collecting Under the Bright Lights, Muscle for the Wing, and The Ones You Do)
 The Outlaw Album (Little, Brown, 2011)
 The Maid's Version (Little, Brown, 2013)

Filmography
 Ride with the Devil (adapted from novel Woe to Live On) (1999)
 Winter's Bone (adapted from novel) (2010)
 Tomato Red (adapted from novel) (2017)

References

External links
 
 Daniel Woodrell, "Night Stand", in Esquire, June 2008

1953 births
Living people
20th-century American novelists
21st-century American novelists
American crime fiction writers
American male novelists
Iowa Writers' Workshop alumni
Writers from Springfield, Missouri
University of Kansas alumni
People from West Plains, Missouri
20th-century American male writers
21st-century American male writers
Novelists from Missouri